The Yellowhead Centre is an ice hockey arena located in Neepawa, Manitoba, Canada.

The 1,200-seat arena was built in 1972 and serves the Town of Neepawa and surrounding municipalities. It is home to a number of local recreational and minor hockey teams, as well as the Neepawa Titans (Manitoba Junior Hockey League), Neepawa Farmers (Tiger Hills Senior Hockey League), and Neepawa Area Collegiate Institute Tigers (high school hockey).  The Yellowhead Chiefs male and female midget 'AAA' hockey teams both play some home games in Neepawa.

Aside from hockey, the Yellowhead Centre has also hosted major curling events, most notably the 2009 Manitoba Scotties Tournament of Hearts and the 2013 Safeway Championship.

External links
Website

References

Indoor arenas in Manitoba
Indoor ice hockey venues in Canada
1972 establishments in Manitoba